Endiandra hypotephra, commonly known as  blue walnut or northern rose walnut, is a species of flowering plant in the family Lauraceae. It is endemic to Queensland, Australia.

References

hypotephra
Flora of Queensland
Taxa named by Ferdinand von Mueller